The 2022–23 ECAC Hockey men's ice hockey season is the 62nd season of play for ECAC Hockey and will take place during the 2022–23 NCAA Division I men's ice hockey season. The regular season is set to begin on October 1, 2022 and conclude on February 25, 2023. The conference tournament is scheduled to begin in early March, 2023.

Season

Coaches
Josh Hauge takes over from interim head coach John Ronan after the mid-season resignation of Rick Bennett.

Records

Standings

Non-Conference record
Of the sixteen teams that are selected to participate in the NCAA tournament, ten will be via at-large bids. Those 10 teams are determined based upon the PairWise rankings. The rankings take into account all games played but are heavily affected by intra-conference results. The result is that teams from leagues which perform better in non-conference are much more likely to receive at-large bids even if they possess inferior records overall.

While the conference on the whole had losing records against three other leagues, two thirds of member teams were at or above .500 for their non-conference records. The result was that most of the ECAC teams were not adversely affected by the league's subpar record, resulting in the conference overperforming in the pairwise rankings when compared to both the CCHA and Hockey East.

Regular season record

Statistics

Leading scorers
GP = Games played; G = Goals; A = Assists; Pts = Points; PIM = Penalty minutes

Leading goaltenders
Minimum 1/3 of team's minutes played in conference games.
GP = Games played; Min = Minutes played; W = Wins; L = Losses; T = Ties; GA = Goals against; SO = Shutouts; SV% = Save percentage; GAA = Goals against average

ECAC tournament

NCAA tournament

Ranking

USCHO

USA Today

Pairwise

Note: teams ranked in the top-10 automatically qualify for the NCAA tournament. Teams ranked 11-16 can qualify based upon conference tournament results.

Awards

ECAC Hockey

References

External links

2022-23
ECAC
2022-23